This is a list of prominent individuals and organizations that voiced their endorsement of John Kasich as the Republican Party's presidential nominee for the 2016 U.S. presidential election.

Federal cabinet-level officials

Former 

 Alberto Gonzales, 80th United States Attorney General (2005–2007), White House Counsel (2001–2005)
 Ray LaHood, 16th Secretary of Transportation (2009–2013) and Congressman from Illinois's 18th district (1995–2009)
 Mike Leavitt, 20th Secretary of Health and Human Services (2005–2009), 10th Administrator of the Environmental Protection Agency (2003–2005) and 14th Governor of Utah (1993–2003)
 Robert McFarlane, 13th Assistant to the President for National Security Affairs (1983–1985)
 Tom Ridge, 1st Secretary of Homeland Security (2003–2005) and 43rd Governor of Pennsylvania (1995–2001)
 Dick Thornburgh, 76th United States Attorney General (1988–1991), and 41st Governor of Pennsylvania (1979–1987)
 Tommy Thompson, 19th United States Secretary of Health and Human Services (2001–2005), and 42nd Governor of Wisconsin (1987–2001)
 Christine Todd Whitman, 9th Administrator of the Environmental Protection Agency (2001–2003) and 50th Governor of New Jersey

Governors

Current 
 Robert J. Bentley, 53rd Governor of Alabama
 Butch Otter, 32nd Governor of Idaho
 Brian Sandoval, 29th Governor of Nevada

Former 
 Jim Martin, 70th Governor of North Carolina (1985–1993)
 Scott McCallum, 43rd Governor of Wisconsin (2001–2003)
 Arnold Schwarzenegger, 38th Governor of California (2003–2011)
 William Weld, 68th Governor of Massachusetts (1991–1997)
 Lincoln Almond, 72nd Governor of Rhode Island (1995–2003)
 George Pataki, 53rd Governor of New York (1995–2006)  and former 2016 presidential candidate
 Jim Douglas, 80th Governor of Vermont (2003–2011)

U.S. Senators

Current 
 Jim Inhofe, Oklahoma
 Rob Portman, Ohio

Former

U.S. Representatives

Current 

Don Young of Alaska
Mike Bishop of Michigan
Gregg Harper of Mississippi
Bill Johnson of Ohio 
Steve Stivers of Ohio
Pat Tiberi of Ohio
Mike Turner of Ohio, also the president of the NATO Parliamentary Assembly
Charlie Dent of Pennsylvania, also chairman of the House Ethics Committee

Former 

Spencer Bachus of Alabama
Mary Bono of California
Tom Campbell of California, current Dean of Chapman University School of Law
Chris Shays of Connecticut 
Lawrence J. DeNardis of Connecticut
Nancy Johnson of Connecticut
Thomas B. Evans, Jr. of Delaware
 Joe Scarborough of Florida (currently a media pundit) (previously endorsed Jeb Bush)
Charles Djou of Hawaii
Dan Burton of Indiana
Larry J. Hopkins of Kentucky 
 Jim McCrery of Louisiana
Connie Morella of Maryland 
Peter G. Torkildsen of Massachusetts
Pete Hoekstra of Michigan
Vin Weber of Minnesota 
Webb Franklin of Mississippi
Michael Parker of Mississippi
Kenny Hulshof of Missouri
Chuck Douglas of New Hampshire
Charles Bass of New Hampshire
Dick Zimmer of New Jersey
James T. Walsh of New York
Joseph J. DioGuardi of New York
Bill Cobey of North Carolina
John Boehner of Ohio, former Speaker of the United States House of Representatives
Mike Oxley of Ohio
Deborah Pryce of Ohio
Martin Hoke of Ohio 
Ralph Regula of Ohio
Steve LaTourette of Ohio
Robert Smith Walker of Pennsylvania 
Jon D. Fox of Pennsylvania
Dick Armey of Texas, former House Majority Leader
Tom Loeffler of Texas 
Steve Bartlett of Texas
Jim Hansen of Utah 
Chris Cannon of Utah  
Thomas M. Davis of Virginia 
G. William Whitehurst of Virginia
George Nethercutt of Washington
Scott Klug of Wisconsin 
Mark Neumann of Wisconsin

U.S. Ambassadors 
 Tom C. Korologos, former ambassador to Belgium (2004–2007)
 William McCormick, former ambassador to New Zealand and Samoa (2005–2009)
 Charles Swindells, former ambassador to New Zealand and Samoa (2001–2005)

Statewide officials 

 California: Steve Poizner Silicon Valley entrepreneur and former insurance commissioner of California,
 Michigan: Brian Calley, Lieutenant Governor of Michigan
 Two from Nevada: Ron Knecht (State Controller of Nevada), Bob Seale (former Nevada State Treasurer)
 New Hampshire: Thomas D. Rath (former attorney general of New Hampshire)
 New Jersey: Andrew Sidamon-Eristoff (former state treasurer) 
 Three from Ohio: Jon Husted (Ohio Secretary of State), Dave Yost (Auditor of Ohio), Mary Taylor (Lieutenant Governor of Ohio) Mike DeWine (Attorney General)
 Pennsylvania: Robert Jubelirer (former lieutenant governor of Pennsylvania)
 Rhode Island: Bernard Jackvony (former lieutenant governor of Rhode Island)
 South Carolina: Buck Limehouse (former South Carolina Secretary of Transportation)
 Two from Vermont: Phil Scott (Lieutenant Governor of Vermont) and Randy Brock (former Vermont Auditor of Accounts)
 Three from Washington: Rob McKenna (former attorney general of Washington), Sam Reed (former secretary of state of Washington) and Ralph Munro (former secretary of state of Washington)
 Wisconsin: Jack Voight, former state treasurer

State legislators

Arizona 
 Arizona State Representative: Tony Rivero, Bob Robson, John Kaites (former)

Arkansas 
 Arkansas State Representative: Mathew Pitsch

Colorado 
 Three Colorado State Representatives: Amy Stephens (former majority leader), B.J. Nikkel (former majority whip), Jeannie Reeser (former)

Delaware 
Two Delaware State Representatives: Deborah Hudson (Minority Whip), Tim Boulden (former)

Georgia 
 Four Georgia State Senators: Bill Cowsert (State Majority Leader), Fran Millar, Rusty Paul (former; also former state party chair, current mayor of Sandy Springs), Chuck Hufstetler
 Four Georgia State Representatives: Tom Taylor, Wendell Willard, David Knight, John Meadows, John Deffenbaugh

Idaho 
 Idaho State Senator: Marv Hagedorn
 Idaho State Representative: Robert Anderst

Illinois 
 Three Illinois State Senators: Christine Radogno (Minority Leader), Daniel Cronin (former), Dave Syverson
 Seven Illinois State Representatives: Ed Sullivan, Jr., David Harris, Ron Sandack, Tom Demmer, Randy Frese, Jil Tracy (former), Chad Hays (Assistant Minority Leader)

Iowa 
 Nine Iowa State Representatives:  Mary Ann Hanusa, Brent Siegrist (former Speaker), David Sieck, Brad Hansen (former), Dan Clute (former), Doug Struyk (former), John Clark (former), Darrell Hanson (former), George Eichhorn (former)
 Two Iowa State Senators: Andy McKean (former), Bob Brunkhorst (former)

Kentucky 
 Kentucky State Representative: Jim Zimmerman,

Louisiana 
 Louisiana State Senator: Norby Chabert

Maine 
 Maine State Senator: Tom Saviello

Maryland 
 Maryland State Senator: Howard Denis (former)
 Seven Maryland State Delegates: Mary Beth Carozza, Ric Metzgar, Robert Flanagan, Tony O'Donnell, Herbert H. McMillan, Michael Malone, Donald E. Murphy (former)

Massachusetts 
 Massachusetts State Senator: Bruce Tarr (Minority Leader)
 Six Massachusetts State Representatives: Paul Frost, Kimberly Ferguson, Peter Durant, F. Jay Barrows Kate Campanale, Lenny Mirra

Michigan 
 Seven Michigan State Senators: Arlan Meekhof (Senate Majority Leader), Wayne Schmidt, Joel Gougeon (former), Beverly Hammerstrom (former majority leader), Tom George (former), Leon Stille (former), Wayne Kuipers (former),
 Eleven Michigan State Representatives: Tom Leonard (Speaker Pro Tempore), Jason Sheppard, Bradford Jacobsen, Chris Ward (former majority leader), Edward Gaffney (former), Chris Afendoulis, Larry Inman, Earl Poleski, Mickey Mortimer (former), Paul H. Scott (former), Andrew Richner

Mississippi 
 Five Mississippi State Senators: Giles Ward (President Pro Tem), Josh Harkins, Brice Wiggins, Billy Hewes (former president pro tem; current mayor of Gulfport), Billy Hudson, 
 Two Mississippi State Representative: Toby Barker, Trey Lamar

Missouri 
 Two Missouri State Senators: Ryan Silvey, Emory Melton

Nevada 
 Member of the Nevada Assembly: John Hambrick (Speaker)

New Hampshire

State Senators 
 Six New Hampshire State Senators:  David Boutin, Ed Dupont (former State Senate President), Andrew Peterson (former), Frederick King, Sr., William S. Bartlett, Jr., Mark Hounsell (former)

State Representatives 
 Nine New Hampshire State Representatives:  Jack Flanagan (House Majority Leader), Harold B. Parker, Doug Scamman (former Speaker), Stella Scamman (former), Robert Rowe, Stephen Darrow, Norman Major, Ken Peterson, Dino Scala (former)

New Jersey 
 New Jersey State Senator: Jen Beck
 New Jersey Assembly Member: Barbara Wright (former)

New York 
 Five Members of the New York State Assembly: Raymond Walter, Andrew Raia, Chad A. Lupinacci Andrew Garbarino, Andy Goodell

North Carolina 
 North Carolina State Senator: Stan Bingham
 Two North Carolina State Representatives: D. Craig Horn, Rex L. Baker (former)

Ohio 
 Twenty-three Ohio State Senators:  Keith Faber (President of the Senate), Frank LaRose., Chris Widener, Joe Uecker, Tom Patton,  Grace Drake (former), Bob Peterson, Kevin Bacon, Jim Hughes, John Eklund, Bill Seitz, Cliff Hite, Jay Hottinger, Gayle Manning, Jimmy Stewart (former), Bill Beagle, Peggy Lehner, Troy Balderson, Scott Oelslager, Frank LaRose, David Burke, Shannon Jones, Randy Gardner
 Thirty-seven Ohio State Representatives:  Jo Ann Davidson (former), Robert R. Cupp, Timothy Derickson, Ross McGregor (former), Tim Ginter, Jeffrey McClain, Marlene Anielski, Nan Baker, Jim Buchy, Andrew Brenner, Mike Duffey, Anne Gonzales, Cheryl Grossman, Stephanie Kunze, Ryan Smith, Robert Sprague, Dave Hall, Margaret Ruhl, Bill Hayes, Scott Ryan, Nathan Manning, Barbara Sears, Bob Hackett, Larry Obhof, Steve Huffman, Niraj Antani, Brian Hill, Tony Burkley, Gary Scherer, Terry Johnson, Bill Reineke, Kirk Schuring, Marilyn Slaby, Anthony DeVitis, Dorothy Pelanda, Ron Amstutz, Cliff Rosenberger (Speaker)

Oregon 
 Two Oregon State Senators: Jason Atkinson (former), Bruce Starr (former)
 Four Oregon State Representatives: Knute Buehler, John Davis, Billy Dalto (former), Derrick Kitts (former)

Pennsylvania 
 Three Pennsylvania State Senators: Joseph B. Scarnati (President pro tem), Earl M. Baker (former), John Gordner
 Three Pennsylvania State Representatives: Gary Day, Fred Keller, Aaron Kaufer

Rhode Island 
 Rhode Island State Senator: Dawson Hodgson (former)

South Carolina 
 Four South Carolina State Senators: Raymond E. Cleary III, Paul G. Campbell, Jr., Greg Gregory, Ronnie W. Cromer
 Six South Carolina State Representatives:  Heather Ammons Crawford, Gary E. Clary, Jeffrey A. Bradley, Chip Limehouse, Donna C. Hicks, Phyllis Henderson

Tennessee 
 Tennessee State Representative: Steve Buttry (former)

Utah 
Four Utah State Senators:Daniel W. Thatcher, Steve Urquhart Brian Shiozawa, Evan Vickers
 15 Utah State Representative: Becky Edwards, Sophia DiCaro, Steve Handy, Merrill Nelson, Kraig Powell, Lowry Snow, Raymond Ward, Bruce Cutler, Jack Draxler, Steve Eliason, Gage Froerer, Tim Hawkes, Don Ipson, Paul Ray, Doug Sagers

Vermont 
 Three Vermont State Senators: Peg Flory, Kevin J. Mullin, Rich Westman

Virginia 
 Four Virginia State Delegates: Glenn Davis, Chris Peace, Ron Villanueva, Thomas Davis Rust
 Three Virginia State Senators: Emmett Hanger, Jeannemarie Devolites Davis (former), Frank Wagner

West Virginia 
 Two West Virginia State Senators: Ryan Ferns, Daniel Hall
 Two West Virginia State Delegates: Roger Hanshaw, Matthew Rohrbach

Mayors and other municipal leaders 
 Arizona: Rick Romley, former county attorney for Maricopa County, Arizona (1989–2004).
 Nevada: Bob Beers (Las Vegas City Councilman)
 Utah: Jon Pike, mayor of St. George, Utah
 Virginia: John Cook (Fairfax County Supervisor)

Republican National Committee members (current and former) 
 Amy Tarkanian, former Nevada Republican chairwoman, wife of Danny Tarkanian
 Chuck Yob, former Republican National Committee member
 Fergus Cullen, former New Hampshire GOP chairman.
 Clarke Reed, former Mississippi GOP chairman.
 Raul Danny Vargas, former chairman of the Republican National Hispanic Assembly
Frank Suitter, former Utah GOP chairman

Businesspeople 
 Philip Geier, former chairman and chief executive officer of the Interpublic Group of Companies
Dan Gilbert, Quicken Loans
 Ken Langone, Home Depot co-founder and CEO of Geeknet
 Stanley Druckenmiller, billionaire hedge fund manager
 Ronald Burkle, billionaire venture capitalist, co-owner of the Pittsburgh Penguins
 Julian Robertson, hedge fund manager
 Rick Caruso, billionaire businessman and philanthropist.
 Robert Addison Day, business executive and philanthropist.

State parties 
 Ohio Republican Party

Other political individuals 
 Robert F. Orr, former North Carolina Supreme Court Associate Justice
 Michael Hayden, former Director of the CIA 
 Joseph Mohorovic, Commissioner of the U.S. Consumer Product Safety Commission
 Bobbie Kilberg, former Director of the Office of Public Liaison.
 Ron Saxton, 2006 Republican nominee for Governor of Oregon
 Richard Tarrant, businessman, 2006 Republican nominee for United States Senator from Vermont

Newspapers 
 The New York Times
 Boston Globe
 The Arizona Republic
 Concord Monitor
 The Keene Sentinel
 Storm Lake Times
 The Portsmouth Herald
 Foster's Daily Democrat
 Nashua Telegraph
 The Daily Nonpareil Council Bluffs, Iowa.
 New Hampshire Valley News
 Monadnock Ledger-Transcript
 The Dallas Morning News
 The State
 The Post and Courier
 Corpus Christi Caller-Times
 Waco Tribune-Herald
 The Free Lance–Star
 Daily Hampshire Gazette
 Detroit Free Press
 SF Tech Beat
 Seattle Times
 Portland Press Herald
Detroit News 
Lexington Herald-Leader 
Cincinnati Enquirer 
Chicago Sun-Times 
The Clarion-Ledger 
Idaho Statesman
Seattle Times
Cleveland Plain Dealer 
Akron Beacon Journal
Journal Star 
Milwaukee Journal Sentinel
Albany Times Union
The Post-Standard (Syracuse.com)
The Post-Star (Glen Falls, New York)
The Daily Gazette (Capital Region, New York)
The Hartford Courant
Iowa City Press Citizen
Quad-City Times

Organizations
 United States Hispanic Chamber of Commerce <

Celebrities, commentators, and activists 

 Tim Allen, comedian and actor
 Charles Barkley, former basketball player and current analyst
 Brady C. Olson, founder of Deez Nuts presidential campaign
 Montel Williams, television personality, radio talk show host, and actor
 Michael Reagan, son of former president Ronald Reagan, and former radio talk show host.
 Urban Meyer, Ohio State Buckeyes football head coach, and 3 time NCAA football championship winning head coach
 Stephen S. Oswald, former NASA astronaut.
 William F. Readdy, former NASA astronaut.
 Eugene Cernan, former Naval aviator, fighter pilot, and NASA astronaut
 Dirk Haire, general counsel to the Maryland Republican Party

See also
 List of Donald Trump presidential campaign endorsements, 2016
 List of Ted Cruz presidential campaign endorsements, 2016
 List of Republicans opposing Donald Trump presidential campaign, 2016

References

John Kasich
Kasich, John
Kasich, John, 2016